Asabea Cropper (also known as Queen Asabea) is a Ghanaian female high-life singer and saxophonist. She is known for her 'love and passion' for headgear styles like the Kilimanjaro style. She claimed her grandmother and mother taught her in 1975. During the URTNA Awards, she was honored as the ’Queen of Highlife Music’.

Career 
She learnt how to play the piano, acoustic guitar and soprano saxophone. She was taught by her brother, Kenteman. In the 1970s, they made a team where they both played for Sweet Talks and Black Hustlers Band.

Personal life 
She is the twin sister of Kenteman. She claimed to be a Ga-Adangbe.

Discography 

 Torwia
 Inamosi
 Wamaya
 I Love So Much

Honors 
In 2019, she was honored at the 2019 edition of the Rhythms On Da Runway fashion show by KOD's Nineteen57 for her contribution to fashion in Ghana. She was also honored by MUSIGA Presidential Grand Ball. She received the Music Industry Heroes Award in the second edition of honoring music legends in Ghana.

In March 2021, she was honored by the organizers of 3Music Awards in an event called 3Music Women's Brunch. She was honored for her accomplishment in the entertainment industry along with Theresa Ayoade, Grace Omaboe, Akosua Adjepong, Dzifa Gomashie, Tagoe Sisters and others.

References 

Ghanaian musicians
Living people
Ghanaian highlife musicians
Year of birth missing (living people)